Martyn, variant of Martin, is a surname of Gaelic origin. In Scotland, Martyn is a sept of Clan Cameron in the West Highlands. In Ireland, it is one of the Tribes of Galway.

Family history

The Martyn family were one of a group of fourteen families who became the premier merchant and political families in the town of Galway during the late medieval and early modern eras. They traded with Scotland, England, Wales, France, Spain, and Portugal. Many were dispossessed by the Irish Confederate Wars and the subsequent Cromwellian conquest. The family have cadet branches in the U.K., Canada, USA, France, Hungary, and several other countries.

There is a worldwide internet based society for people with the family name Martin and Martyn.

Notable Martyns of Galway

Wylliam Martin (fl. 1519), builder of the Spanish Arch
Thomas Óge Martyn (fl. 1533–1577), builder of Galway's West Bridge
William Óge Martyn (fl. 1566–1593), notorious Sheriff and Mayor of Galway
Richard Óge Martyn (1602–1648), lawyer and Irish Confederate leader
Francis Martin (1652–1714), theologian
Richard Martin (1754–1834), member of Irish Volunteers, supporter of Catholic Emancipation, and founder of the Royal Society for the Prevention of Cruelty to Animals
Peter Martyn (1772–1827), soldier
Andrew H. Martyn (1784–1847), parish priest who died during the Great Famine
Thomas B. Martin (1786–1847), Member of Parliament and landlord who died saving his tenants during the Great Famine
Mary Letitia Martin (1815–1850), novelist
Edward Martyn (1859–1923), arts patron and political activist; co-founded Abbey Theatre
Violet Florence Martin (1862–1915), novelist and short-story writer
Ferenc Martyn (1899–1986), Hungarian artist and sculptor descended from the Martyns of Galway.

Martyns outside Ireland
The surname Martyn is common in the West of England, particularly in Devon and Cornwall, where the name spelling could be Martyn, Martin or Marten. In 1543 John Martyn, John Martyn and Joan Martyn are listed with reference to Davidstow (Dewstow) in the "Cornwall Subsidies in the reign of Henry Vlll". In the 1569 Muster Roll John Marten and William Marten are mentioned for Davidstow. In the Register for St Stephens by Launceston the baptisms are given for two sons of Richard Martin of Dewstowe – Nicholas Martin 24 May 1584 and John Marten 21 November 1586. Dated 27 July 1646 is a Davidstow Administration for John Marten the Elder, late of Davidstow and it is possible that this is the John baptised at St Stephens in 1586.

Notable people from outside Ireland with the surname Martyn
 John Martyn (publisher) (died 1680), London printer and publisher
 Henry Martyn (1781–1812), Anglican priest and missionary in India and Persia
 David Forbes Martyn (1906–1970), Scottish-born Australian physicist

See also
 Martin (name)
 FitzMartin
 Lists of most common surnames
 Family name etymology
 Family name affixes
 Family history
 Patronymic
 Personal name

References

External links
 Official genealogy site; accessed 10 February 2015.

Sources

*

Irish families
Political families of Ireland
Surnames of Irish origin